James Rowley may refer to:

 James Joseph Rowley (1908–1992), head of the United States Secret Service
 James Rowley (cricketer) (1830–1870), English cricketer